Time Renegades is a South Korean romantic thriller film directed by Kwak Jae-yong. It was released in South Korea by CJ Entertainment on April 13, 2016.

Plot
On January 1, 1983, high school teacher Ji-hwan (Jo Jeong-seok) meets a robber and loses consciousness while proposing to his fellow schoolmate and lover Yoon-jung (Im Soo-jung). On January 1, 2015, detective Gun-woo (Lee Jin-wook) will also be shot and killed by the criminal he was chasing. About 30 years apart, Ji-hwan and Geon-woo, who were taken to the same hospital at the same day and at the same time, manage to survive from life-and-death situations, and after that day, the two begin to see each other's daily lives through their dreams.
The two men didn't believe at first, but find themselves real people at different times. Geon-woo is attracted to Ji-hwan's fiancée, Yoon-jung, as she is destined to meet So-eun (im Su-jeong), who looks surprisingly similar to her. One day, while investigating an unsolved murder case in the 1980s, Gunwoo finds a record of Yun-jung being killed 30 years ago and begins digging into the case. Ji-hwan also learns from Gun-woo that his fiancée, Yoon-jung, is destined to die soon. The two men, together, start a hunt that goes beyond time to prevent the scheduled death of Yun-jung...
different times, one murder 
The desperate struggle of two men to save her beloved begins!

Cast 

 Im Soo-jung as Seo Yoon-jung / Jung So-eun, 
 Jo Jung-suk as Baek Ji-hwan, A  1983 high-school teacher who meets 2015 homicide detective Kim Gun-woo in his dreams.
 Lee Jin-wook as Kim Gun-woo, A 2015 homicide detective who meets 1983 high school teacher Baek Ji-hwan in his dreams.
 Jung Jin-young as Chief Kang (Kang Seung-beom)
 Lee Tae-ri as young Kang Seung-beom
 Lee Ki-woo as Detective Lee
 On Joo-wan as Teacher Park
 Jun Shin-hwan as Biology teacher/Gas-Masked Murderer
 Kim Bo-ra as Choi Hyun-joo, Chief Kang's wife.
 Jung Woong-in as Kang Hyung-chul, Kang Seung-beom's father, who was imprisoned after being framed for a murder that he never committed by the Gas Masked Murderer.
 Lee Bom as Dodge ball student
 Park Ah-sung as Science lab male student

Reception

Box office

References

External links 
 
 

2016 films
2010s Korean-language films
South Korean romantic thriller films
Films about dreams
Films about educators
Films about police officers
Films about time travel
South Korean high school films
Films set in 1983
Films set in 2015
CJ Entertainment films
Films directed by Kwak Jae-yong
2010s romantic thriller films
2010s high school films
2010s South Korean films